Robert Logan (1784 - 22 April 1830) was the Roman Catholic Bishop of Meath, Ireland from 1827 to his death in 1830.

Early life and ministry 
Logan was born near Navan, County Meath in 1784, he was ordained a priest in the Diocese of Meath on 27 May 1809.

Episcopal Ministry 
Pope Leo XII named him Coadjutor bishop of Meath and titular bishop of Tremithus on 24 August 1824, he was consecrated on 28 October of that year.
On the death of his predecessor Patrick Joseph Plunkett he succeeded as ordinary of the diocese on 11 January 1827.

Death
He died while in office on 22 April 1830.

References

External links
 Website of the Diocese of Meath

1784 births
1830 deaths
Roman Catholic bishops of Meath
Bishops appointed by Pope Leo XII
19th-century Roman Catholic bishops in Ireland